The 1994 All Japan Grand Touring Car Championship was the first full season of premier class GT racing in Japan to be promoted by the new GT Association (GTA). It was marked as well as the twelfth season of a JAF-sanctioned sports car racing championship, dating back to the All Japan Sports Prototype Championship. Recognized as the first season of what is now the Super GT Series, the 1994 season introduced the familiar dual-class structure, and the Success Ballast handicap system that would become staples of the series in the years to come.

The premier class, GT1, featured an eclectic mix of Japanese-built GT cars such as the fleet of factory-operated Nissan Skyline GT-Rs, and later, the Toyota Supra GT from Team SARD - as well as foreign-made GT cars like the Porsche 911 RSR, the Lamborghini Countach, and the Ferrari F40 - mixed in with the Porsche 962C that was a holdover from the previous Group C era, and even a former WRC-spec Lancia 037 that entered as a one-off. The secondary class, GT2, featured privately-built sports cars such as the ones used in the former Japan Super Sport Sedan Championship.

The GT1 class champion was the #1 Calsonic Nissan Skyline GT-R driven by Masahiko Kageyama, and the GT2 class champion was the #29 Korg Kegani Porsche 964 driven by Sakae Obata.

Schedule

Teams & Drivers

GT1

GT2

Season results

Point Ranking

GT1 Class (Top 5)

Drivers

GT2 Class (Top 5)

Drivers

Notes
1.Tetsuya Ota did not drive during the final and was ineligible for championship points.

See also
Super GT
Japanese Touring Car Championship

References
 Super GT/JGTC official race archive  (archived from the original)
 1994 season results 

Super GT seasons
JGTC